Nicolás Almagro was the defending champion but lost in the final, 7–6(7–5), 6–4, to Jerzy Janowicz.

Seeds

Draw

Finals

Top half

Bottom half

References
Main Draw
Qualifying Draw

AON Open Challenger - Singles
AON Open Challenger
AON